In geometry, the Petersen–Morley theorem states that, if
,
,

are three general skew lines in space, if
,
,
 are the lines of shortest distance
and if ,  and 
are the lines of shortest distance respectively
is a single line meeting at right angles all of
,
,
and
.

The theorem is named after Johannes Hjelmslev (who published his work on this result under his original name Johannes Trolle Petersen) and Frank Morley.

References
 
 
 

Mathematical theorems
Theorems in geometry